Mār-bīti-apla-uṣur, inscribed DUMU-É-A-PAB on contemporary inscriptions on Lorestān bronze arrowheads or dA-É-AxA-ŠEŠ in the Dynastic Chronicle, means “O Marbīti, protect the heir.” Marbīti was a deity associated with Dēr with a sanctuary in Borsippa. Mārbītiaplauṣur reigned from  980 to 975 BC and was the sole king of Babylon’s short-lived seventh or Elamite Dynasty. He was a contemporary of Assyrian king Aššur-reš-iši II.

Biography

The circumstances surrounding the fall of the previous Bazi dynasty and his ascendancy are unknown. His name was wholly Akkadian and he was described as a remote descendant of Elam, šà.bal.bal ˹libir NIM.˺MA.KI (Akkadian: liplippi Elamti Labīru), in the Dynastic Chronicle. There are no known rulers of Elam bearing Akkadian titles, but his reign coincides with a blank period in Elamite political history. His rule endured for six years and he was buried in the palace of Sargon or “a legitimate king,” depending on the interpretation of ina É-GAL LUGAL(-)GI.NA qé.bir, suggesting an interment suitable for a rightful king. The Eclectic Chronicle records the month of Nisānu in his fourth year but the event is not preserved. It may be concerning the suspension of the Akitu festival due to Aramean incursions, as this is the typical subject of the chronicle.

Four bronze arrowheads from Lorestān have been recovered inscribed with his name and the royal title šar kiššati, “king of the world.” They were held as part of the Foroughi collection in Tehran.

Inscriptions

References

10th-century BC Babylonian kings
10th-century BC rulers
Kings of the Universe